The agricultural cooperatives in Norway consists of 13 companies, each organised as independent farmer owned cooperatives. They cover four different areas for the farmers: refining and sale of produce, financial services, breeding and insemination, and retail of agricultural equipment. All the cooperatives cooperate through the company Norsk Landbrukssamvirke. In total the companies have a revenue of NOK 58 billion and have 18,000 employees. TINE and Nortura are responsible for about a quarter of the revenue each. Though none of the cooperatives hold any monopolies, their dominant position periodical causes debate about the structure of the agricultural processing industry.

Companies
 Landkreditt (mortgages)
 Gjensidige (insurance, not solely agricultural)
 Felleskjøpet (farming equipment retailer)
 GENO (breeding and insemination of cattle)
 Norsk Kjøttfeavlslag (breeding of cattle)
 Norsvin (breeding and insemination pigs)
 Norsk Sau og Geit (breeding and insemination of sheep and goats)
 TINE (dairy)
 Diplom-Is (ice cream)
 Nortura (slaughterhouses)
 Gilde (red meat)
 Prior (white meat and eggs)
 Norges Skogeierforbund (lumber trade)
 Gartnerhallen (fruit, berries and vegetable trade)
 Honningcentralen (honey trade)
 HOFF Norske Potetindustrier (potato products)
 Norges Pelsdyralslag (skins and fur)

See also
 Agricultural cooperative
 Cooperatives of Norway

External links
 Norsk Landbrukssamvirke